Takin' It to the Streets  may refer to:
Takin' It to the Streets (The Doobie Brothers album)
"Takin' It to the Streets" (song from above album) 
Takin' It to the Streets (FM album)